Marian Pisaru (born January 4, 1954) is a former Romanian ice hockey player. He played for the Romania men's national ice hockey team at the 1976 Winter Olympics in Innsbruck, and the 1980 Winter Olympics in Lake Placid.

Including participation at the 76/80 Olympics, Marian Pisaru was part of the Romanian team which played in the A-group of the World Championships in 1977, where the Romanian team was relegated despite defeating USA 5-4. This game is widely regarded as Romania's finest hour on the international ice hockey scene.

References

1954 births
Living people
Ice hockey players at the 1976 Winter Olympics
Ice hockey players at the 1980 Winter Olympics
Olympic ice hockey players of Romania
Romanian ice hockey left wingers